Spring Hill Mall is a shopping mall in West Dundee and Carpentersville, Illinois. The mall's anchor stores are Kohl's and Cinemark. There are 4 vacant anchor stores that were once Carson Pirie Scott, Sears,  Macy's, and Barnes & Noble.

History
Spring Hill Mall was developed by Homart Development Company, then owned by Sears, Roebuck & Company. The mall opened in October 1980 with two anchors, Marshall Field & Company and Sears, Roebuck & Company. Originally, Carson Pirie Scott was scheduled to open an anchor store at the location now occupied by Kohl's (originally MainStreet), but this deal was canceled. The Carson's chain opened a Honey Bear Farm store in the west wing of the mall in October 1980. Carson Pirie Scott eventually opened a location at the mall in 1990 when former anchor Bergner's (which was added in 1981 as Bergner-Weise) was re-branded as Carson Pirie Scott. Bergner's parent company, P.A. Bergner & Co, acquired the Carson's chain in 1989 and elected to re-brand its Chicago-area Bergner stores as Carson Pirie Scott. On April 18, 2018, it was announced that Carson's would be closing as the parent, Bon-Ton Stores, was going out of business. Carson's closed permanently on August 29, 2018.

The anchor location on the northwest side of the mall opened in 1984 as Joseph Spiess Company, an Elgin, Illinois-based specialty department store company. Joseph Spiess closed the Spring Hill Mall store in 1994. This location was later Wickes Furniture, Steve and Barry's (closed February 2009), Home Furniture Mart (opened 2011), American Eagle Furniture (opened 2013) and Darna Furniture. This location was vacated in 2015.

The anchor location at the west end of the mall opened in 1983 as JCPenney. On January 24, 2011, JCPenney announced that they would close this location by June 1, 2011.

A portion of the mall where current anchor Kohl's and former anchor Carson Pirie Scott & Co. (opened as Bergner-Weise) are located, and a portion of the inside mall immediately adjacent to the two anchor store locations are wholly within the village of Carpentersville whom to this day is responsible for providing police and fire safety services along with the issuance of all applicable permits, licenses and requests for zoning changes to those anchor and mall stores that are not within the village of West Dundee.

Red Lobster opened in the parking lot in May 1982.

A Jewel-Osco store opened near the mall on January 30, 1992.

In 1994, Best Buy and Target Greatland opened across the street from the mall. Best Buy closed in 2012. Target Greatland closed on May 3, 2014 and was replaced by a sports complex.

A Denny's restaurant opened outside the mall in 1996.

In March 2004, Barnes & Noble opened in the Sears wing. A Home Depot store opened north of the mall later that year in December.

Today, the lone remaining anchor store is Kohl's. The Marshall Field's store was renamed Macy's on September 9, 2006.

In 2011, General Growth Properties, following its bankruptcy, spun off 30 mall properties, including Spring Hill Mall, into Rouse Properties. Rouse Properties was acquired by Brookfield Properties Retail Group in 2016. General Growth (later GGP) was acquired by Brookfield in 2018.

In 2012, LA Fitness opened outside the mall on the location of the former Toys "R" Us.

The site was previously the D. Hill Nursery, which relocated to Union, Illinois to make way for the mall.

On February 20, 2015, the owner announced plans for a redevelopment of the mall. The first phase calls for the demolition of the west end of the mall, including the food court and former JCPenney and Darna Furniture locations, in order to make room for a new 37,000 sq ft. Cinemark movie theater that opened on December 15, 2016. Plans also call for an entertainment and dining pavilion and re-configuring the enclosed mall into an exterior shopping center.

On March 23, 2017, H&M opened at the mall.

On November 6, 2019, it was announced that Sears will be closing in February 2020. The closure of Sears left Macy's and Kohl's as the remaining anchors. The closure also left the mall with no original anchors from its 1980 opening. On January 7, 2020, it was announced that Macy's would be closing. This left the mall with Kohl's, Barnes & Noble and Cinemark as its only remaining anchors. On October 22, 2021, Barnes & Noble closed and relocated to nearby Algonquin Commons, leaving Kohl's and Cinemark as the malls only remaining anchors. Spring Hill Mall was sold to the Kohan Retail Investment Group in 2021.

Bus routes 
 Pace

  552 North State/Spring Hill Mall  
  803 Carpentersville Local

References

External links

Shopping malls in Kane County, Illinois
Shopping malls established in 1980
Kohan Retail Investment Group
1980 establishments in Illinois